The 2002 Formula Renault 2.0 UK Championship was the 14th British Formula Renault Championship. The season began at Brands Hatch on 1 April and ended on 22 September at Donington Park, after seventeen rounds held in England and Scotland, with most events only staging one race and two events staging a double header.

Teams and drivers

Race calendar and results

Drivers' Championship

 Points were awarded on a 32-28-25-22-20-18-16-14-12-11-10-9-8-7-6-5-4-3-2-1 basis, with 1 point for fastest lap. A driver's 15 best results counted towards the championship.

External links
 The official website of the Formula Renault UK Championship

UK
2002 in British motorsport
Renault 2.0 UK